Kiisa is a village in Põlva Parish, Põlva County in Estonia.

References

Villages in Põlva County